Acacia phlebocarpa, also known as tabletop wattle, is a shrub of the genus Acacia and the subgenus Plurinerves and is native to northern Australia.

Description
The shrub has a flattened crown. Like most species of Acacia it has phyllodes rather than true leaves. The semi-pungent phyllodes are thinly-coriaceous and have three distant raised main nerves with many parallel secondary nerves. It blooms from April to June and produces yellow flowers. The simple inflorescences occur singly in the axils. The linear seed pods that form after flowering are strongly curved or have a single coil.

Distribution and habitat 
an area in the Kimberley  region of Western Australia, and north western Queensland and the Northern Territory.
It grows on stony and lateritic soils and on sandstone on plains and  rocky ridges. The soils are often shallow and are stony and sandy and are found in open woodland communities or with species of Triodia.

See also
 List of Acacia species

References

phlebocarpa
Acacias of Western Australia
Flora of the Northern Territory
Taxa named by Ferdinand von Mueller
Plants described in 1859
Flora of Queensland